Calliclytus macoris is a species of beetle in the family Cerambycidae. It was described by Lingafelter in 2011.

References

Tillomorphini
Beetles described in 2011